The Badarpur–Dullabcherra Passenger is a passenger train belonging to Northeast Frontier Railway of Indian Railways that runs between Dullabcherra and Badarpur Junction in Assam. It is currently being operated with 55690 train number on a daily basis. The train makes its main halt at Karimganj Junction for 25 minutes & loco/rake reversals also takes place here. The train runs with SGUJ/WDP-4D.

Service 

The 55690/Badarpur - Dullabcherra Passenger runs with an average speed of 19 km/h and completes 71 km in 3h 40m.

Route and halts 

The important halts of the train are:

Coach composite 

The train consists of seven coaches:

 6 General Unreserved
 1 Seating cum Luggage Rake

Traction

Both trains are hauled by a Siliguri Loco Shed based WDM3D diesel locomotive from Dullabcherra to Badarpur and vice versa.

Rake sharing 

The train shares its rake with 55687/55688 Dullabcherra–Silchar Fast Passenger.

Direction reversal

Train reverses its direction one time:

See also 

 Dullavcherra railway station
 Badarpur railway station
 Dullavcherra - Silchar Fast Passenger

Notes

References

External links 

 55689/Dullavcherra - Badarpur Passenger
 55690/Badarpur - Dullavcherra Passenger

Rail transport in Assam
Slow and fast passenger trains in India
Railway services introduced in 2017